Chedimanops is a genus of spiders in the Palpimanidae family. It was first described in 2017 by Zonstein & Marusik. , it contains 2 species, both from Congo.

References

Palpimanidae
Araneomorphae genera
Spiders of Africa